Four Square Mile is an unincorporated community and a census-designated place (CDP) located in and governed by Arapahoe County, Colorado, United States. The CDP is a part of the Denver–Aurora–Lakewood, CO Metropolitan Statistical Area. The CDP is surrounded by Denver on the north, west, and south and by Aurora on the east. The name is derived from the four square miles bounded by Quebec Street, Mississippi Avenue, Havana Street and Yale Avenue. Annexation of the Arapahoe County enclave was contested between Denver and Aurora in the early 1970s, with Denver annexing east from Quebec Street and Aurora west from Havana Street. Denver’s annexations were ultimately stopped by the Poundstone Amendment; Aurora is not similarly limited but made its most recent annexation to Dayton Street in 1984, leaving nearly three of the four square miles unincorporated. The Four Square Mile CDP includes Sullivan, a previous unincorporated community designation. The area lies in ZIP codes 80231 and 80247.

Geography

Demographics

See also

Outline of Colorado
Index of Colorado-related articles
State of Colorado
Colorado cities and towns
Colorado census designated places
Colorado counties
Arapahoe County, Colorado
Colorado metropolitan areas
Front Range Urban Corridor
North Central Colorado Urban Area
Denver-Aurora-Boulder, CO Combined Statistical Area
Denver-Aurora-Broomfield, CO Metropolitan Statistical Area

References

External links

Arapahoe County website

Census-designated places in Arapahoe County, Colorado
Census-designated places in Colorado
Denver metropolitan area